The Deputy Prime Minister of the Cook Islands is the second most senior officer in the government of the Cook Islands. From 1965 to 1981, the position was called the Deputy Premier. When the office of Premier was renamed to Prime Minister in 1981, the Deputy Premier became the Deputy Prime Minister.

List of officeholders
Key

References

 
Cook Islands-related lists